The Leland Trail is a  footpath in Somerset, England. It was named after the antiquary John Leland, and runs from King Alfred's Tower in Penselwood, southwest to Ham Hill Country Park near Yeovil.

History

The path was established by creating rights of way via tracks and lanes. It is named after John Leland, who visited South Somerset during the years 1535–1543. In his role as royal librarian, his journeys and tasks during that period were mapped out for him by King Henry VIII. His job was to reveal to the King all reference to "antiquities" and possessions of the local churches and priories. The exact route taken by Leland over much of South Somerset may never be known but the remaining records of the time form the basis of the trail.

Route

Typical all day walks allow the track to be traversed in manageable stages. The route may be broken into seven parts.

Then the journey onward to Castle Cary takes a little over two hours to cover the next . The next stage to North Cadbury will add about another two hours to the journey. Queen Camel is a further  and takes just over two hours.

Montacute is the next "port of call" en route, and the slightly more difficult terrain means well over two hours to complete the next . Reaching Ham Hill, the end of the trail, takes another hour.

Places of interest

The forest of Penselwood. Bruton has its packhorse bridge, dovecote and famous twin-towered church. Near Castle Cary is Cadbury Castle, whose summit offers a spectacular panorama of the South Somerset countryside. The busy military airfield at Yeovilton is also home to the Fleet Air Arm Museum. Montacute House is also close to the site of the former Cluniac Montacute Priory. At Ham Hill Country Park, Exmoor, the Quantock Hills, and the Bristol Channel can be seen. Looking east is the trail's starting point, Alfred's Tower.

Intersecting trails
The Leland Trail links with the Monarch's Way at Ilchester, and the Liberty Trail and the River Parrett Trail at Ham Hill.

Key points and map

References

Footpaths in Somerset
Long-distance footpaths in England